Paradou Athletic Club, known as Paradou AC or simply PAC for short, is an Algerian football club based in Algiers. The club was founded in 1994 by members of the Hydra AC junior team, the club colours are blue and yellow. Their home stadium, Ahmed Fellak Stadium, has a capacity of some 5,000 spectators but the club receives its opponents in Omar Benrabah Stadium. The club is currently playing in the Algerian Ligue Professionnelle 1.

In May 2017, Paradou AC returned to the Algerian Ligue Professionnelle 1 after a 10 years absence.

History

Early years
The ambition of a group of friends was to create a space where young people could meet in search of leisure, hobbies especially after hard days of schooling, mostly studying. After careful consideration and various proposals, it was decided to set up a classic football team and the name of Paradou Athletic Club (by abbreviation PAC) was chosen. As for the colors of the club the choice was made in a really anecdotal way, indeed several proposals were made but none was unanimous. We were in the midst of a discussion when the Swedish ambassador passed in his vehicle with his country's flag, the idea immediately emerged. (Yellow and blue). A first meeting of the founding members was held at the COLOMBA restaurant, were present: Mahi Ali, Mahi Mohamed, Kabla Kamel, Kabla Rezki, Kheiredine Zetchi, Oudghiri Ahmed, Mahi Abdelfettah, Zetchi Hassen, Kabla Toufik, Hammouche Abdennour, Chitour Omar, Oudghiri Rafik, Guecem Kamel, Bouhellal Kamel. A few people who contributed to the creation of the club also participated in this "Collation" meeting. The Paradou AC epic began in September 1994 with an Algiers Wilaya Cup match at the Ben Aknoun stadium which ended in a 3–2 victory, a victory foreshadowing a bright future. This is how the administrative procedures to obtain approval were carried out by law with all the authorities concerned. This document was issued on August 16, 1994 under number 359. As soon as it was obtained, the managers of the club set about setting up the Senior teams and the young categories and set training as an objective.

The founding members of the Paradou Athlétic Club, including the brothers Kheiredine and Hassen Zetchi, have taken care to structure this club with rigorous management since its creation and to make it, as far as possible, an example, by developing moral values such as brotherhood, humanity, respect for others which are the basis of any success of a high level athlete. From its first sporting season 1994–95, the Paradou AC reached all levels until it ended up in 2005 in Ligue 1 and ended up making a place for itself among all Algerian clubs and gaining respect thanks to its career. After three years in DNA, Paradou AC has finally found the elite and is back playing in Ligue 2 as a professional. Several players trained by Paradou AC, whose vocation it is, have made and still make the heyday of certain D1 clubs, such as Lamouri Djediat, Mokhtar Benmoussa, Hocine El Orfi, Saad Tedjar, Billel Ouali and Hichem Nekkache.

Honours

Domestic competitions
 Algerian Ligue Professionnelle 2
Champion (1): 2016–17

Players

Algerian teams are limited to two foreign players. The squad list includes only the principal nationality of each player;

Current squad

Reserve Squad

Out on loan

Personnel

Current technical staff

Paradou AC/JMG "El Ankaoui" Academy
In 2007, Paradou AC launched their academy in a partnership with JMG Academy, run by Frenchman Jean-Marc Guillou. The cost of the academy is estimated to be about 600 000 € over 7 years, including the purchase of land at a site in Tessala El Merdja (in the outskirts of Alger), and construction of housing and facilities for the players and staff. Since its creation, the academy has had a tremendous amount of success. The current team is made up of players aged 13 to 15 years old, and they have regularly beaten much older teams, while playing without shoes or a goalie. The team is coached by Olivier Guillou and Djamel Aïch.

Players from Paradou AC to Europe

Players from Paradou AC to other countries

List of Paradou AC international footballers

Players

Notes

References

External links

 
Football clubs in Algeria
Football clubs in Algiers
Association football clubs established in 1994
Algerian Ligue 2 clubs
1994 establishments in Algeria
Sports clubs in Algeria
Algerian Ligue Professionnelle 1 clubs